Latrell Mitchell (né Goolagong; born 18 June 1997) is an Australian professional rugby league footballer who plays as a  for the South Sydney Rabbitohs in the NRL, and has represented both New South Wales in the State of Origin series and Australia at international level as a .

He began his National Rugby League career with the Sydney Roosters and was a member of the 2018 and 2019 NRL Grand Final championship rosters as a centre. Mitchell has also represented the Indigenous All Stars, and played as a er during his earlier career.

Background
Mitchell (né Goolagong) was born in Taree, New South Wales and is of Aboriginal descent from Birrbay and Wiradjuri people. He attended Chatham High School and played junior rugby league for the Taree Red Rovers as well as Group 3 Rugby League under 18's for Taree City club.

Playing career

Early career
In 2013 and 2014, Mitchell played for the New South Wales under-16s and under-18s teams respectively. Mitchell played for the Roosters' S. G. Ball Cup team during the 2014 season, where he was named as the S. G. Ball Player of the Year, and the man-of-the-match in the S. G. Ball Grand Final.

In November 2014, Mitchell was selected for the Australian Schoolboys team for their tour of England and France. He scored 13 tries in 7 games and was named player of the series.

Mitchell played in the Roosters' NYC team during the 2015 season. On 16 June 2015, he re-signed with the club until the end of the 2019 season. On 8 July 2015, Mitchell played at fullback for the New South Wales under 20s team and scored a try in the 32–16 win at Lang Park. On 14 September 2015, Mitchell was named on the interchange bench in the 2015 NYC Team of the Year.

2016
Mitchell was named in the Roosters' 2016 NRL Auckland Nines squad. During the tournament, he scored 4 tries in 3 games. 

Mitchell also played in the Roosters' 2016 World Club Series win against St Helens. 

In Round 1 of the 2016 NRL season, he made his NRL debut for the Roosters against the South Sydney Rabbitohs and subsequently played in every game of the season, finishing with 14 tries as the team's leading try and point scorer.

2017

In February, Mitchell played as an interchange in the 2017 All Stars match at McDonald Jones Stadium.

In the first round of the NRL season, Mitchell scored a hat-trick in the Roosters' 32–18 win over the Gold Coast Titans at Robina Stadium. He helped the Roosters climb up the ladder to 2nd place after 26 rounds scoring plenty of tries. He scored the game-winning try in week 1 of the 2017 finals against the Broncos. In the preliminary final against North Queensland, Mitchell endured a horror night which involved him sending two kick off restarts out on the full which both led to tries for the opposition. The Sydney Roosters lost the match 29–16 in what proved to be one of the upsets of the season.

2018
Mitchell was selected to play for New South Wales in The 2018 State of Origin series by coach Brad Fittler. He scored a try in the first match of the series.  Mitchell also played in the next two games of the series; although New South Wales won the second game but lost the third, the side did win its first Origin shield since 2014.

In the NRL 2018 finals series, Mitchell was handed a one match suspension after being charged for a crusher tackle on Josh Dugan in the Roosters victory over Cronulla. Mitchell subsequently missed the preliminary final victory over Souths.

On 30 September, Mitchell played in the 2018 NRL Grand Final against the Melbourne Storm scoring a try and kicking four goals in the Sydney Roosters 21–6 win.

At the National Dreamtime Awards 2018, Mitchell was named Male Sportsperson of the Year.

2019
In February, Mitchell played as a centre in the 2019 All Stars match at AAMI Park and kicked 3 out of 7 goals.

In round 6 of the 2019 NRL season, Mitchell scored a try and kicked the winning field goal as the Sydney Roosters defeated Melbourne 21–20 in golden point extra time. 

In round 8, Mitchell scored a hat-trick and kicked 7 goals as the Sydney Roosters defeated Wests Tigers 42–12 at the Sydney Cricket Ground.

In Game 1 of the 2019 State of Origin series, Mitchell was sin binned for a professional foul on Matt Gillett in the 58th minute, and dropped for the subsequent games.

In round 14 against the Bulldogs, Mitchell scored 2 tries and kicked 5 goals in a 38–12 victory at the Sydney Cricket Ground.
In round 18 against Newcastle, Mitchell scored a try and kicked 8 goals as the Sydney Roosters won the match 48–10 at the Sydney Cricket Ground.
In Round 20 against the Gold Coast, Mitchell scored 2 tries and kicked 9 goals as the Sydney Roosters won the match 58–6 at the Sydney Cricket Ground.

In round 22 against the New Zealand Warriors, Mitchell scored 2 tries and kicked 5 goals. The Sydney Roosters won the match 42–6 at the Sydney Cricket Ground.

On 2 October, Mitchell was named as the Dally M centre of the year at the Dally M Awards ceremony.
Mitchell played at centre in the club's 2019 NRL Grand Final victory over the Canberra Raiders at ANZ Stadium.

On 25 October, Mitchell kicked 4 goals for Australia's 26–4 victory over New Zealand in the Oceania Cup.

2020

In January, Mitchell's manager Matt Rose brokered a transfer for him from the Sydney Roosters to the South Sydney Rabbitohs on a one-year deal worth $600,000 with the club having the option of committing by 30 April to the 2021 season for a reported $800,000.

In February, Mitchell played as fullback in the 2020 All Stars match at Cbus Super Stadium.

Mitchell made his debut for South Sydney in round 1 of the 2020 NRL season against Cronulla-Sutherland. However, he was benched by coach Wayne Bennett after 55 minutes of play.

In round 5, Mitchell scored his first try for South Sydney when they defeated the Gold Coast Titans 32–12 at Western Sydney Stadium.

In round 15, Mitchell scored two tries and kicked one goal in a 56–16 victory over Manly-Warringah at ANZ Stadium.

In round 16, Mitchell was taken from the field with a hamstring injury during Souths 38–0 victory over Parramatta, and was later ruled out for the season.

2021
In January, Mitchell reportedly signed a two-year contract extension worth around $875,000 per season until the end of 2023 with South Sydney through his new manager Warwick Wright after former manager Matt Rose allowed his own accreditation as an agent to lapse.

In February, Mitchell played as fullback in the 2021 All Stars match at North Queensland Stadium and kicked two goals.

In round 5 of the 2021 NRL season, Mitchell scored two tries and kicked a field goal in South Sydney's 35–6 victory over Brisbane.

On 20 April, Mitchell was suspended for four weeks after being charged over two incidents during South Sydney's victory over the Wests Tigers in round 6.  The incidents involved Mitchell lashing out at Wests player Luke Garner with his boot, and a late hit to the head of David Nofoaluma.  Mitchell was also fined $3000 by the NRL and ruled ineligible for a 2021 Dally M Medal due to this suspension.

Mitchell played for New South Wales in all three games in the 2021 State of Origin series. He scored two tries and kicked goal in Game 1.

In round 20, Mitchell scored two tries for South Sydney in a 50–14 victory over the St. George Illawarra Dragons.

In round 24, Mitchell scored two tries for South Sydney in a 54–12 victory over the Sydney Roosters. However, his season ended when sin-binned for an illegal shoulder charge on Roosters player Joseph Manu, who left the field with a fractured cheekbone. Mitchell subsequently took an early plea after being charged with a grade two reckless high tackle charge and was suspended for six matches (675 points). Without his prior offences, Mitchell would have been offered a four-week ban. Consequently, Mitchell missed playing in the 2021 finals series and the 2021 NRL Grand Final against the Penrith Panthers.

On 1 September 2021, NSW State of Origin coach Brad Fittler warned that Mitchell could "end up shortening his career" if unable to stay out of trouble on the field. Two months later, "Latrell Mitchell took out the True Blue Award, which is judged by the (NSW) coaching staff and goes to a player who displays qualities upon which the team culture is built."

2022

The balance of Mitchell's 2021 six-week suspension carried forward into 2022. This ruled him ineligible to play in the Indigenous All-Stars annual representative exhibition match as well as round 1 of the 2022 NRL season.

In round 2, Melbourne defeated South Sydney 15–14 at AAMI Park. Although Mitchell missed his three conversion attempts for Souths, he did kick a two-point field goal in the 80th minute to send the match into golden point extra time.

In round 3, Mitchell kicked four goals and scored one try for South Sydney in a 28–16 victory over the Sydney Roosters.

In round 4, Penrith defeated South Sydney 26–12 at Penrith Stadium. Mitchell kicked two goals.

Prior to round 5, South Sydney head coach Jason Demetriou revealed that Mitchell "was battling a knee injury". In round 5, Mitchell only played during the first fifteen minutes. He scored a try for Souths against the St. George Illawarra Dragons at Stadium Australia. In later play, he suffered a hamstring injury after being tackled, and left the field. Mitchell was expected to be sidelined for eight weeks. After round 5, his official NRL goal kicking conversion rate for the 2022 season was 54.6% and for defence, 82.4% tackle efficiency.

In round 16, Mitchell returned from injury and kicked five goals for South Sydney in a 30–12 victory over the Parramatta Eels at Accor Stadium.

In round 17, Mitchell stood in as captain and kicked six out of eight goals for South Sydney in their 40–28 victory over the Newcastle Knights at McDonald Jones Stadium. In the 18th minute, he was placed on report for high contact to the head of Newcastle winger Dominic Young.

In round 20, Cronulla defeated South Sydney 21-20 at PointsBet Stadium. Mitchell missed three field goal attempts in golden point extra time.

Instead of attending training on the Tuesday morning prior to round 25, Mitchell went to his northern NSW farm "to recharge his batteries ahead of the finals" the following week. In round 25, he successfully kicked two of three conversion goal attempts for South Sydney in their 26–16 loss to the Sydney Roosters at Sydney Football Stadium. In the 70th minute, Mitchell was sin-binned for ten minutes for deliberately impeding the play the ball off the back of repeat set restarts.

The following week, Mitchell kicked five goals and scored one try for South Sydney in a 30–14 elimination final victory over Sydney Roosters at Allianz Stadium. Then, in semi final 2 on 17 September, Mitchell kicked seven goals for South Sydney in their 38–12 victory over Cronulla at Allianz Stadium. On 24 September, Mitchell kicked two goals for South Sydney in their 32–12 preliminary final loss to Penrith at Accor Stadium.

In October, he was named in the Australia squad for the 2021 Rugby League World Cup.

2023
On 5 February 2023, Mitchell was arrested and charged in Canberra with resisting a territory public official, fighting in a public place and failing to comply with an exclusion direction. Mitchell was filmed crying out about pain in both shoulders while being arrested and was later reportedly visited by South Sydney’s club doctor to check for any injuries. The NRL's Integrity Unit investigated the incident but did not respond when asked if Mitchell would still play in the All Stars match on 11 February 2023. Nevertheless, Mitchell's management company subsequently released an apology on his behalf at Sydney airport on 6 February as he departed for New Zealand with the All Stars team. Mitchell was listed to appear in the Magistrates Court of the Australian Capital Territory on 22 February, one week prior to the commencement of the 2023 NRL season He pleaded not guilty, and the case was adjourned to October 2023.

Personal life
Mitchell's registered birth name was Goolagong. His parents are Trish Goolagong and Matt Mitchell. His maternal great aunt is former tennis player Evonne Goolagong Cawley. During his early teens, Latrell and his two brothers (Shaquai and Lionel) changed to their father's surname. Shaquai also plays for the South Sydney Rabbitohs.

There are 116 nations listed as the birthplace of NRL players. Although players are not obliged to do so, prior to Game 1 of the 2019 State of Origin series, Mitchell announced that he would not sing the Australian National Anthem because it did not represent Aboriginal Australians.

On 27 April 2020, Mitchell was fined $1000 by the NRL and placed under investigation after he broke strict lockdown protocols with fellow NRL player Josh Addo-Carr by going on a weekend camping trip during the COVID-19 pandemic. Addo-Carr was also investigated for use of a firearm. On 28 April, Mitchell was fined an additional $50,000 by the NRL for breaching strict self isolation protocols and for bringing the game into disrepute. On 9 November, Taree Local Court sentenced Mitchell to a 12-month conditional release order after he pleaded guilty to giving a firearm to a person not authorised by a licence or permit.

In August 2021, after Mitchell pleaded guilty and was suspended from the NRL for six matches, Mitchell's uncle Maurice Goolagong claimed that Mitchell "is struggling in the aftermath as his partner has been receiving death threats". A few days later, when a reporter asked how Mitchell was going, South Sydney head coach Wayne Bennett responded: "He’s very well, thanks. I’m sure he’d appreciate you asking that." Bennett also confirmed that Mitchell was still physically with the team in the Queensland COVID bubble, particularly playing the role of the opposition as they do different training drills. The youth responsible for directing threats via social media was given a police caution.

Mitchell and his long-term partner Brielle Mercy have two children.

References

External links

South Sydney Rabbitohs profile
NRL profile

1997 births
Living people
Australia national rugby league team players
Australian rugby league players
Indigenous All Stars players
Indigenous Australian rugby league players
New South Wales Rugby League State of Origin players
Rugby league centres
Rugby league fullbacks
Rugby league players from Taree
Rugby league wingers
South Sydney Rabbitohs players
Sydney Roosters players
Wiradjuri people
South Sydney Rabbitohs captains